Outbreak of Hostilities is a 1981 Australian film set prior to the beginning of World War II.

Cast
Scott Burgess as Bobby
Colleen Fitzpatrick as Barbara
Cornelia Frances as Miriam
George Mallaby as Vince

References

External links
Outbreak of Hostilities at AustLit

Outbreak of Hostilities at National Film and Sound Archive

1981 films
1981 romantic drama films
1980s war drama films
Australian war drama films
Australian romantic drama films
Films set on the home front during World War II
1980s English-language films
1980s Australian films